Hot Shit may refer to:

 "Hot Shit" (song), by Cardi B, Kanye West and Lil Durk
 Hot Shit!, album by Quasi
 "Country Grammar (Hot Shit)", song by Nelly

See also
 "Thot Shit", song by Megan Thee Stallion
 Hotshot (disambiguation)